"Yer So Bad" is a song co-written and recorded by Tom Petty. It was released in 1990 as the fifth single from his first solo album Full Moon Fever.

Content
It tells from the singer's viewpoint about his greedy sister being lucky enough to marry a yuppie, then got divorced and took the yuppie for all he was worth in the proceedings and is now a swinger dating another singer while her ex-husband is unable to find a new partner, is possibly bankrupt and is contemplating suicide ("head in the oven"). In both verses, the singing brother of the sister cannot decide which is worse but is sure what happened to his ex-brother in law won't ever happen to him because the singer has "you to save me" and that "in a world gone mad, yer so bad".

Music video
In the music video for this song, the sister and yuppie (played by Charles Rocket) are shown at their wedding reception with Petty as the photographer, then dissolves to two Los Angeles County (?) sheriff deputies hauling the resisting husband out of their marital house while he tries unsuccessfully to take as many possessions that he can to his car that he drives off in and dissolves to a National Enquirer-type newspaper with a front-page article about it in bold print block letters called "CHEATING HUSBAND'S HEAD EXPLODES", then later dissolves to a bar where the wife, apparently a singer herself, is laughing and flirting with the band's drummer, who later goes home with her to the former yuppie couple's luxurious spacious house. The expelled husband, after driving down the Los Angeles (?) freeway, checks into a cheap motel across town where he opens a metal briefcase revealing a blow up doll that he is inflating as his new artificial "companion". A construction scene appears with a new house being built and a construction worker wearing a T-shirt that says "DIE YUPPIE SCUM" while sumo-like men are shown dancing on the house's construction site, each carrying a 12-inch LaserDisc in their hands. The video later dissolves to the ex-husband driving in his convertible with his blow-up doll next to him in the front seat, trying to keep it seated in heavy traffic, and ends by showing him walking down the street carrying the doll in public.

Reception
"Yer So Bad" was named one of Petty's 50 best songs by Rolling Stone magazine, calling it "Petty at his most caustically hilarious".

Charts

References

External links
Yer So Bad music video at YouTube

Tom Petty songs
1990 songs
1990 singles
Rockabilly songs
Songs written by Tom Petty
Songs written by Jeff Lynne
Song recordings produced by Jeff Lynne
MCA Records singles